John Alfred Terraine (15 January 1921 – 28 December 2003) was an English military historian, and a TV screenwriter.  He is best known as the lead screenwriter for the landmark 1960s BBC-TV documentary The Great War, about the First World War, and for his defence of British General Douglas Haig – who commanded the British Expeditionary Force on the Western Front from late 1915 until the end of the war – against charges that he was "The Butcher of the Somme".

Early life and education
Terraine was born in London and was educated at Stamford School and at Keble College, Oxford.

Radio and television
After leaving Oxford in 1943, he joined BBC radio and continued to work for the BBC for 18 years, ending as its Pacific and South African Programme Organiser.  After resigning from the BBC in 1961, Terraine worked as a freelance television screenwriter.  Among other series, Terraine was associate producer and chief screenwriter of the 1963–64 BBC-TV documentary The Great War, and co-wrote its sequel The Lost Peace (1965).  For Rediffusion and Thames Television he wrote The Life and Times of Lord Mountbatten (1966–68) and Lord Mountbatten: A Man for the Century (1969), and later collaborated with Mountbatten on an illustrated biography based on the series.  Terraine found Mountbatten an impressive performer, but was intrigued by his "curious mix of boastfulness and diffidence". Terraine wrote and narrated The Mighty Continent (1974–75), a 13-part BBC-TV history of Europe in the first three-quarters of the 20th century.

Writing
Terraine had 16 books published, most of them dealing with aspects of the great European wars of the 20th century, and numerous articles and book reviews for The Daily Telegraph.  His first major study of the First World War, Mons: The Retreat to Victory was published in 1960. In 1964 Terraine edited a collection of diaries written by General James Lochhead Jack during the First World War, which became a best-seller in the United Kingdom. The Right of the Line: The Royal Air Force in the European War 1939–45 (1985) won the Yorkshire Post Book of the Year award. His last book Business in Great Waters: The U-Boat Wars, 1916–1945 was published in 1989.

Later career
Terraine was the founding president of the Western Front Association from 1980 to 1997, after which he became its patron. One obituarist wrote that for sheer scholarship, the quality and accessibility of his writing and for his debunking of historical myths, Terraine was one of the outstanding military historians of the 20th century.

Terraine was for many years a member of the Royal United Services Institute for Defence Studies. He was awarded the Institute's Chesney Gold Medal in 1982. He was elected a fellow of the Royal Historical Society in 1987.

Views
According to his obituary in The Independent:

John Terraine was one of the outstanding military historians of the 20th century. His intellect, scholarship and breadth and sharpness of vision marked him out amongst his peers as one to be listened to with great care and attention, and challenged with circumspection, although challenged he was.The fundamental reason for the controversy he aroused, and the challenges his challenges met, was that his study of generalship in the First World War led him to criticise, indeed demolish, the argument that British generals in the period 1914–18 were all "donkeys", that their actions simply led to slaughter and disaster. What he could not abide was the Oh! What a Lovely War syndrome espoused by the historical, political and pacifist left and also to some extent by B.H. Liddell Hart. In his work he made a very strong case for the view that British generals were actually pretty good and, in the end, unlike their enemies, won the war with a great victory.

Personal life and death
In 1945 Terraine married Joyce Waite; they had one daughter.

Terraine died in London, aged 82.

Works
Mons: The Retreat to Victory (New York: Macmillan, 1960) read online
The Battle of Guise, August 1914 (History Today, 1960) read online
The Army in Modern France (History Today, 1961) read online
Douglas Haig: The Educated Soldier (1963) read online
Ordeal of Victory (Philadelphia: J.B. Lippincott, 1963) read online
General Jack's Diary 1914–1918: The Trench Diary of Brigadier-General J.L. Jack, D.S.O. (London: Eyre and Spottiswoode, 1964) read online
The Great War: A Pictorial History (New York: Macmillan, 1965)
Monash: Australian Commander (History Today, 1966) read online
The Life and Times of Lord Mountbatten (London: Hutchinson, 1968; new ed. 2013) read online
Impacts of War, 1914 & 1918 (1971) read online
Democracy at War, Part I (History Today, 1971) read online
Democracy at War, Part II (History Today, 1971) read online
 The Mighty Continent: A View of Europe in the Twentieth Century (1975) read online
Trafalgar (New York: Mason, Charter: 1976) read online
The Road to Passchendaele: The Flanders Offensive of 1917: A Study in Inevitability (London: Cooper, 1977) read online
To Win A War: 1918, the Year of Victory (Garden City, New York: Doubleday, 1978) read online
The Smoke and the Fire: Myths and Anti-Myths of War, 1861–1945 (London: Sidgwick and Jackson, 1980) read online
White Heat: The New Warfare, 1914–18 (1982) read online
The First World War: 1914–1918 (1984).
A Time for Courage: The Royal Air Force in the European War, 1939–1945 (1985).
The Right of the Line: The Role of the RAF in World War Two (1985).
Business in Great Waters: The U-Boat Wars, 1916–1945 (1989) read online
John Terraine: Essays on Leadership and War 1914–18 (Western Front Association, 1998) read online

References

Historians of World War I
English military writers
People educated at Stamford School
1921 births
2003 deaths
Alumni of Keble College, Oxford
Fellows of the Royal Historical Society
BBC people
English military historians
Documentary war filmmakers
Writers from London